The 2000 Bucknell Bison football team was an American football team that represented Bucknell University during the 2000 NCAA Division I-AA football season. Bucknell finished fifth in the Patriot League. 

In their sixth year under head coach Tom Gadd, the Bison compiled a 6–5 record. Vince Ficca, Justin Lustig and Lucas Phillips were the team captains.

The Bison outscored opponents 242 to 172. Their 2–4 conference record placed fifth in the seven-team Patriot League standings. 

Bucknell played its home games at Christy Mathewson–Memorial Stadium on the university campus in Lewisburg, Pennsylvania.

Schedule

References

Bucknell
Bucknell Bison football seasons
Bucknell Bison football